Shin Suk-ju (August 2, 1417 – July 23, 1475) was a Korean politician  during the Joseon Dynasty. He served as Prime Minister from 1461 to 1466 and again from 1471 to 1475. He came from the Goryeong Shin clan (고령 신씨, 高靈 申氏).

Shin was an accomplished polyglot, and was particularly well educated in the Chinese language.  He served as a personal linguistic expert to King Sejong, and was intimately involved in the creation and application of the Korean alphabet known in modern times as Hangul.  Shin used the newly created hangul system to create an accurate transcription of spoken Mandarin Chinese in 15th century Ming dynasty China.
These transcriptions haven proven accurate and reliable, and his transcriptions are now "an invaluable source of information on the pronunciations of Ming-era [Mandarin]."

Family 
 Great-Great-Grandfather
 Shin Sa-gyeong (신사경, 申思敬)
 Great-Grandfather
 Shin Deok-rin (신덕린, 申德隣)
 Grandfather 
 Shin Po-si (신포시, 申包翅) (1361 - 1432)
 Grandmother 
 Lady Kim of the Gyeongju Kim clan (경주 김씨, 慶州 金氏); daughter of Kim Chung-han (김충한, 金忠漢)
 Father 
 Shin Jang (신장, 申檣) (1382 - 8 February 1433)
 Uncle - Shin Pyeong (신평, 申枰) (1390 - 1455)
 Aunt - Lady Yi of the Taean Yi clan (태안 이씨, 泰安 李氏); daughter of Yi Hoe (이회)
 Aunt - Lady Ma of the Jangheung Ma clan (정부인 장흥 마씨, 貞夫人 長興 馬氏); daughter of Ma Cheon-mok (마천목, 馬天牧) (1358 - 14 March 1431)
 Cousin - Lady Shin of the Goryeong Shin clan (정부인 고령 신씨, 貞夫人 高靈 申氏) (? - 1504); Yun Gi-gyeon's second wife
 Cousin-in-law - Yun Gi-gyeon (윤기견, 尹起畎)
 First Cousin - Deposed Queen Yun of the Haman Yun clan (폐비 윤씨) (15 July 1455 – 29 August 1482)
 Uncle - Shin Je (신제, 申梯)
 Mother
 Lady Jeong of the Naju Jeong clan (나주 정씨, 羅州 丁氏)
 Grandfather - Jeong Yu (정유, 鄭有)
 Siblings
 Older brother - Shin Maeng-ju (신맹주, 申孟舟)
 Older brother - Shin Jung-ju (신중주, 申仲舟) (1412 - 1447)
 Older sister - Lady Shin of the Goryeong Shin clan (고령 신씨, 高靈 申氏)
 Brother-in-law - Jo Hyo-mun (조효문) (? - 1462)
 Younger brother - Shin Song-ju (신송주, 申松舟) (1419 - 1464)
 Younger brother - Shin Mal-ju (신말주, 申末舟) (1429 - 1503)
 Sister-in-law - Lady Seol (설씨)
 Younger sister - Lady Shin of the Goryeong Shin clan (고령 신씨, 高靈 申氏)
 Brother-in-law - Choi Seon-bok (최선복)
 Wife and children
 Princess Consort Musong of the Musong Yun clan (무송군부인 무송 윤씨) (? - 23 January 1456); daughter of Yun Gyeong-yeon (윤경연, 尹景淵)
 Son - Shin Ju (신주, 申澍) (1434 - 21 February 1456)
 Daughther-in-law - Lady Han of the Cheongju Han clan (청주 한씨, 淸州 韓氏)
 Grandson - Shin Jong-heub (신종흡, 申從洽) (1454 - ?)
 Grandson - Shin Jong-ok (신종옥, 申從沃) (1455 - )
 Grandson - Shin Jong-ho (신종호, 申從濩) (1456 – 1497)
 Granddaughter-in-law - Lady Yi of the Jeonju Yi clan (전주 이씨, 全主 李氏) (? - 1539)
 Great-Grandson - Shin Hang (신항) (1477 - 1507)
 Great Granddaughter-in-law - Yi Su-ran, Princess Hyesuk (혜숙옹주, 惠淑翁主) (1478–?)
 Adoptive Great-Great-grandson - Shin Su-gyeong (신수경, 申秀涇) (1501 - ?)
 Adoptive Great-Great-Great-grandson - Shin Ui, Lord Yeongchan (영천위, 靈川尉 신의, 申檥) (1530 - 1584)
 Adoptive Great-Great-Great Granddaughter-in-law - Yi Ok-hyeon, Princess Gyeonghyeon (경현공주) (1530 - 1584) 
 Son - Shin Myeon (신면, 申沔) (? - 21 May 1467)
 Daughter-in-law - Lady Jeong (정씨) 
 Grandson - Shin Yong-gwan (신용관, 申用灌) (1459 - ?)
 Grandson - Shin Yong-gae (신용개, 申用漑) (5 October 1463 - 1519)
 Granddaughter - Lady Shin of the Goryeong Shin clan (고령 신씨, 高靈 申氏)
 Grandson-in-law - Kang Han-son (강학손, 姜鶴孫)
 Son - Shin Chan (신찬, 申澯)
 Granddaughter - Lady Shin of the Goryeong Shin clan (고령 신씨, 高靈 申氏)
 Grandson-in-law - Jeong Yu-kang (정유강, 鄭有綱)
 Son - Shin Jeong (신정, 申瀞) (1442 - 24 April 1482)
 Daughter-in-law - Lady Yi of the Jeonju Yi clan (전주 이씨) 
 Grandson - Shin Yeong-hong (신영홍, 申永洪) (1469 - ?)
 Grandson - Shin Yeong-cheol (신영철, 申永澈) (1471 - ?)
 Son - Shin Jun (신준, 申浚) (1444 - ?)
 Daughter-in-law - Lady Yu (유씨, 柳氏)
 Grandson - Shin Bok-sun (신복순, 申復淳) (1464 - ?)
 Granddaughter - Lady Shin of the Goryeong Shin clan (고령 신씨, 高靈 申氏)
 Grandson-in-law - Yi Byeon, Prince Geumcheon (금천군 이변)
 Son - Shin Bu (신부, 申溥) (1446 - ?)
 Granddaughter - Lady Shin of the Goryeong Shin clan (고령 신씨, 高靈 申氏)
 Grandson-in-law - Jo Su-kang (조수강, 趙壽崗)
 Son - Shin Hyeong (신형, 申泂) (1449 - ?)
 Daughter-in-law - Lady Jeong of the Yeonil Jeong clan (연일 정씨, 延日 鄭氏)
 Grandson - Shin Gwang-yun (신광윤, 申光潤) (24 September 1468 - 15 October 1554)
 Grandson - Shin Gwang-han (신광한, 申光漢)
 Son - Shin Pil (신필, 申泌) (1454 - ?)
 Grandson - Shin Se-yeon (신세연, 申世淵) (1473 - ?)
 Grandson - Shin Se-gwang (신세광, 申世洸) (1474 - ?)
 Daughter - Lady Shin of the Goryeong Shin clan (고령 신씨, 高靈 申氏) (1455 - ?)
 Son-in-law - Shin Myeong-su (신명수, 申命壽)
 Concubine 
 Lady Bae (배씨, 裵氏)
 Son - Shin Pil (신필, 申潔)
 Daughter - Royal Consort Suk-won of the Goryeong Shin clan (숙원 신씨, 淑媛 申氏)
 Son-in-law - Sejo of Joseon (조선 세조) (2 November 1417 – 23 September 1468)

Popular culture
 Portrayed by Lee Hyo-jung in the 2011 KBS2 TV series The Princess' Man.

See also 
 Han Myung-hoi
 Jeong In-ji
 Gwon Ram
 Hong Yun-seong
 Hong Dal-son

References
Footnotes

Works Cited
Handel, Zev (2014). "Why Did Sin Sukju Transcribe the Coda of the Yào 藥 Rime of 15th Century Guānhuà with the Letter ㅸ <f>?".  Studies in Chinese and Sino-Tibetan Linguistics: Dialect, Phonology, Transcription and Text, eds. Richard VanNess Simmons, Newell Ann Van Auken.  Language and Linguistics Monograph Series 53. Taipei: Academia Sinica, pp. 293–308.

External links 
 Shin Suk-ju 
 Shin Suk-ju:britannica 
 Shin Suk-ju:Nate 

1417 births
1475 deaths
Korean Confucianism
Korean Confucianists
Korean revolutionaries
15th-century Korean philosophers
15th-century Korean poets